The Tale of King Mu, Son of Heaven is a fantasy version of the travels of King Mu of Zhou, historical fifth sovereign of the Zhou dynasty of China, r. 976–922 BCE or 956–918 BCE.

The written originals of the fantasy biography of King Mu and a biography of his mother were found along with the Bamboo Annals in the tomb of Wei Xiang-zi (d. 296 BCE), king of Wei, rediscovered in 281 CE during the Jin dynasty (266–420), after which they were merged into a single tale during transmission. 

Transmitted are four textual lineages which became independent from the original. Later versions were sometimes called Zhou Wang Youxing, literally "(The) Zhou King('s) Travels" or "Travels of the Zhou King".

Contents
King Mu dreamed of being an immortal. He determined to visit the Western heavenly paradise of the Queen Mother of the West on the Kunlun and taste her Peaches of Immortality. A brave charioteer named Zao Fu carried the king and seven worthy companions by chariot to the Queen Mother, whom he feasts at blue gem pool in Chapter 3 with a banquet, wine, gifts, and decorous exchange of poems with some sense of his being subsequently rejuvenated or at least blessed with posterity. The implications of the poems seem to cast the Queen Mother of the West as a vassal whom King Mu confirms in ruling her own land.

Chapter 6 mainly recounts the death of King Mu's favorite consort, Cheng Ji, with details of her funeral with a huge entourage which takes eight days to arrive at her burial site. Heartbroken, King Mu tarries there, fishing, hunting, until a soldier chides him into returning his attention to government and slowly traveling back to his capital.

The Tale of King Mu, Son of Heaven is an early textually extant narrative case of Chinese literature stressing a particular heroic human, though the biography, apparently fantastic or considered credible, is a chief format of Chinese literature from its outset with focus on sovereigns and their exploits, particularly with governmental preoccupation with geography through the peripheries of the emergent Chinese state.

Commentaries
The earliest commentary to the text was written by the scholar Guo Pu (276–324) during the Eastern Jin.

During the Qing dynasty (1644-1912), the text was revisited by Tan Cui 檀萃, Hong Yixuan 洪頤煊 and Zhai Yunsheng 翟雲升.

Modern scholarship
Porter, Deborah Lynn. From Deluge to Discourse: Myth, History, and the Generation of Chinese Fiction. State University of New York, 1996.

Notes

References

External links
 穆天子传  by Pu Guo, The Project Gutenberg EBook of Mu Tian Zi Chuan, by Pu Guo in Chinese
 English text of 穆天子傳 (Tale of King Mu, Son of Heaven), discussion about English translations at chinese.stackexchange.com

Zhou dynasty
Horses in Chinese mythology